Larisa Viktorovna Merk (born  16 March 1971 in Novosibirsk) is a Russian rower who competed for Russia in four Summer Olympics.

In 2000, she was a crew member of the Russia boat which won the bronze medal in the quadruple sculls event.

External links
profile

1971 births
Living people
Russian female rowers
Olympic rowers of Russia
Rowers at the 1996 Summer Olympics
Rowers at the 2000 Summer Olympics
Rowers at the 2004 Summer Olympics
Rowers at the 2008 Summer Olympics
Olympic bronze medalists for Russia
Sportspeople from Novosibirsk
Olympic medalists in rowing
Medalists at the 2000 Summer Olympics
World Rowing Championships medalists for Russia